"Baby Baby Bye Bye" is a song recorded by Jerry Lee Lewis and released as a single in March 1960 on Sun Records, Sun 337, featuring the Gene Lowery Singers, backed with "Old Black Joe". The recording was reissued in 1969 as a 7" 45 single as Sun 42 as part of the Sun Golden Treasure Series. The song was also released in the UK in 1960 as a 45 single on London Records as HLS 9131.

Background
"Baby Baby Bye Bye" was recorded for Sun Records. The words and music were credited to Lewis Smith and copyrighted in 1960 although on the label two songwriters are credited, "Lewis, Smith". Discogs credited Jerry Lee Lewis and Huey "Piano" Smith as the songwriters. The personnel were: Jerry Lee Lewis on vocals and piano with the Gene Lowery Singers on background vocals. The B side featured "Old Black Joe" written by Stephen Foster in a new arrangement by Jerry Lee Lewis. The single was released in March, 1960 as Sun 337 with the Matrix # U-393 as by Jerry Lee Lewis with The Gene Lowery Singers. The single was Jerry Lee Lewis's first release in 1960. The song was published by Knox Music, Inc., and Crystal Music.

The song was also released as a 45 single in the UK, Australia, New Zealand, France, and Japan.

The single reached no. 47 on the UK singles chart in June, 1960 in a one-week chart run.

Album Appearances
"Baby Baby Bye Bye" appeared on the following albums:

Jerry Lee Lewis: Nuggets, Charly Records, 1977   
Jerry Lee Lewis: Classic, Bear Family Records, 1989   
High School Confidential [Single], Collectables, 1992   
Great Stars of Rock 'N' Roll, Vol. 2, Fat Boy,  1995
The EP Collection, Vol. 2...Plus, See For Miles Records, 1996   
Complete Sun Singles, Vol. 4, Bear Family Records, 1997
Jerry Lee Lewis: The Essential Sun Collection, Recall (UK), 1999
 25 All-Time Greatest Sun Recordings, Varese Sarabande, 2000

Sources
Bonomo, Joe (2009). Jerry Lee Lewis: Lost and Found. New York: Continuum Books.
Tosches, Nick (1982). Hellfire. New York: Grove Press.
Gutterman, Jimmy (1991). Rockin' My Life Away: Listening to Jerry Lee Lewis. Nashville: Rutledge Hill Press.
Gutterman, Jimmy (1993). The Jerry Lee Lewis Anthology: All Killer, No Filler. Rhino Records.
Lewis, Myra; Silver, Murray (1981). Great Balls of Fire: The Uncensored Story of Jerry Lee Lewis. William Morrow/Quill/St. Martin's Press.

References

Jerry Lee Lewis songs
Sun Records singles
1960 songs
1960 singles
Rock-and-roll songs